Enemy? is a 2015 Indian mystery film produced by A. Durga Prasad and directed by Dinesh P. Bhonsle who has previously directed Hindi-movie Calapor. The music was composed by Schubert Cotta. The film won the Best Konkani film Award in 63rd National Film Awards, Vigyan Bhawan New Delhi. It was officially selected to be screen at the 21st Kolkata International Film Festival 2015, Goa Marathi Film Festival 2016 and London Indian Film Festival 2016. Enemy was selected for the Indiwood Panorama Competition section at the 2nd edition of Indiwood Carnival 2016 in Hyderabad.

Plot

In the midst of the festive season, a Goan Catholic family discovers that they have lost their property to the Government and their family honour is at stake. Sanjit, the soldier son has to fight a different battle. As the tension and drama builds up, Sanjit finds himself pushed to the edge.

Cast
 Meenacshi Martins
 Salil Naik
 Antonio Crasto
 Samiksha Desai
 Rajiv Hede
 Shishir Krishna Sharma
 Vishwajit Phadte
 Nitin Kolvekar
 Rupa Chari
 Arvind Singh
 Ramakant Anvekar
 Gauri Kamat
 Mithun Mahambrey
 Tanvi Bambolkar
 Anuj Prabhu
 Libereta Fernandes

Music
Music director Schubert Cotta has composed the tracks for the film, sung by Myron Mascarenhas with Mecxy Cotta and Jesus Gomes. The lyrics are by Ubald Fernandes, Vasco Rego SJ, Schubert Cotta and Roque Lazarus. The album was officially released on 7 September 2015. Five tracks were released by Prasad Creations.

Theme song: Sung by Mecxy Cotta
Sopnachea Molbar: Sung by Myron Mascarenhas, Jesus Gomes and Mecxy Cotta
Hason Nachon: sung by Mecxy Cotta
Devan Monxak: Sung by Mecxy Cotta
Boddvo Sorghincho: Sung by Mecxy Cotta

References

External links
 Official Website
 

2015 films
2010s Konkani-language films
Films directed by Dinesh P. Bhonsle